The Château de Bannegon is a ruined castle in the commune of Bannegon in the Cher département of France.

It has been listed since 1965 as a monument historique by the French Ministry of Culture.

See also
List of castles in France

References

External links
 

Castles in Centre-Val de Loire
Monuments historiques of Centre-Val de Loire
Buildings and structures in Cher (department)